Fordyce Municipal Airport , formerly known as H.L. Hopkins–Fordyce Municipal Airport, is a public use airport in Dallas County, Arkansas, United States. It is owned by the City of Fordyce and located three nautical miles (6 km) northeast of its central business district. This airport is included in the National Plan of Integrated Airport Systems for 2011–2015, which categorized it as a general aviation facility.

Facilities and aircraft 
Fordyce Municipal Airport covers an area of 109 acres (44 ha) at an elevation of 193 feet (59 m) above mean sea level. It has one runway designated 5/23 with an asphalt surface measuring 3,183 by 60 feet (970 x 18 m).

For the 12-month period ending July 31, 2010, the airport had 2,200 general aviation aircraft operations, an average of 42 per week. At that time there were two single-engine aircraft based at this airport.

References

External links 
 H. L. Hopkins - Fordyce Municipal (5M4) at Arkansas Department of Aeronautics
 Aerial image as of January 2002 from USGS The National Map
 
 

Airports in Arkansas
Transportation in Dallas County, Arkansas
Buildings and structures in Fordyce, Arkansas